A Cold Night's Death (also known as The Chill Factor) is a 1973 American made for television horror-thriller film. The film was shown on January 30, 1973, on the ABC network.

The film was directed by Jerrold Freedman and starred Robert Culp, Eli Wallach, and Michael C. Gwynne. Culp and Wallach are two research scientists at the Tower Mountain Research Station (filmed at the University of California's high altitude Barcroft Research Station) who are trying to unravel the mysterious death of a colleague.

Plot
After the mysterious deaths of their colleagues, scientists Robert Jones (Robert Culp) and Frank Enari (Eli Wallach) are sent to an isolated research station deep in the Arctic Circle to continue their observation of monkey behavioral patterns. As the two men quarrel over who has to clean the station and other responsibilities, they slowly realize that the deaths of their co-workers may have something to do with a mysterious and dangerous presence, one that the monkeys increasingly fear.

Cast
 Robert Culp as Robert Jones
 Eli Wallach as Frank Enari
 Michael C. Gwynne as Val Adams
 Vic Perrin as Ryan Horner (voiceover; uncredited)

Release

Reception

Graeme Clark from The Spinning Image rated the film seven out of ten stars, praising the film's atmosphere, performances, and score. Dave Sindelar from Fantastic Movie Musings and Ramblings also praised the film's atmosphere and performances, calling it "one very effective TV-movie thriller". The Terror Trap awarded the film three out of four stars, calling it "a triumph of mood creation".

See also
 List of American films of 1973

References

External links
 
 

1973 horror films
1970s science fiction horror films
1970s thriller films
1973 television films
1973 films
American horror thriller films
American science fiction horror films
ABC Movie of the Week
American science fiction television films
Films scored by Gil Mellé
Films directed by Jerrold Freedman
1970s English-language films
1970s American films